Bob Gaudet is an American ice hockey coach who served as the head coach at Dartmouth from 1997 until 2020.

Career
Bob Gaudet started his term at Dartmouth playing three games in goal for the Big Green as a freshman. Once he became the starter the following year Dartmouth had one of its most successful periods, winning 19 games in back-to-back years and reaching the NCAA tournament both years (the last time Dartmouth was able to do so). Gaudet graduated after the 1980–81 season and pursued a short professional career before retiring a player.

Gaudet returned to his alma mater in 1982 as an assistant coach first under George Crowe and then Brian Mason before accepting an offer to become the head coach at Brown. Gaudet began slowly at Brown, going 1–25 in his first season as he tried to repair a flagging program, rebounding with a 10-win campaign in his second year. In 1992–93 Gaudet got Brown to their first winning season in 16 years, earning the team its first tournament berth since 1976 (their last as of 2021). Two years and two Winning seasons later Gaudet received the ECAC Hockey Coach of the Year Award.

After the promotion of Roger Demment to an administrative position Dartmouth turned to Gaudet to fill the post, giving him a third stint in Hanover. As he had done with Brown, Gaudet took a few years to return Dartmouth a prominent position, providing the Dartmouth faithful with a winning season in 2000–01, their first since his junior season. That began a run of seven consecutive seasons with Dartmouth above .500 including their first conference regular season title in 2005–06. For his effort, Gaudet was awarded his second Coach of the Year Award. In his time at Dartmouth Gaudet has become the second most successful coach in program history, behind only Eddie Jeremiah in terms of both wins and tenure.

Head coaching record

References

External links

1959 births
American ice hockey coaches
American men's ice hockey goaltenders
Brown Bears men's ice hockey coaches
Dartmouth Big Green men's ice hockey coaches
Dartmouth Big Green men's ice hockey players
Ice hockey coaches from Massachusetts
People from Saugus, Massachusetts
Living people
Sportspeople from Essex County, Massachusetts
Ice hockey players from Massachusetts